Sandy Ridge, sometimes spelled Sandyridge, is an unincorporated community in Lowndes County, Alabama, United States.

Demographics

Sandy Ridge appeared on the 1880 and 1890 U.S. Censuses, but was not separately returned in 1890. It has not appeared on the census rolls since.

Geography

References

Unincorporated communities in Alabama
Unincorporated communities in Lowndes County, Alabama